ŠK Báhoň is a Slovak association football club located in Báhoň. It currently plays in 3. liga (3rd tier in Slovak football system).

Colors and badge 
Its colors are red and black.

Notable Managers 
Marián Tibenský
Marián Šarmír
Miroslav Karhan

External links
Futbalnet profile

References

Football clubs in Slovakia
Association football clubs established in 1951
1951 establishments in Czechoslovakia